BYI could refer to:

 Bally Technologies; New York Stock Exchange symbol BYI
 Barry Island railway station; National Rail station code BYI
 Burley Municipal Airport, Idaho, United States; IATA airport code BYI